The Passion of Josef D is a play by Paddy Chayefsky based on the life of Josef Stalin. It only had a short run on Broadway in 1964 despite being directed by Chayefsky himself and featuring a cast including Luther Adler and Peter Falk. This experience scarred Chayefsky from having his plays produced on Broadway for the rest of his career.   David Amram composed acappella vocal music for the play and hired two perfect pitch singers to get the ensemble started on key.  Tyrone Guthrie was scheduled to direct but when he became unavailable Chayefsky decided he would direct it himself, his first and last time directing. Many years later, when asked by original cast member Robert Aberdeen if he had any unproduced plays that he would consider having produced, Chayefsky replied, "Bob, I'm not interested in theater.  There's no money in Theater." Jerome Robbins came in (Known as the Doctor) to try to help to no avail.  David Amram said of the play, "If Guthrie and not Chayefsky had directed it, we'd still be running."

Original cast
Luther Adler as Lenin  
Peter Falk as Stalin  
Alvin Epstein as Constable Kentinov/ Alexander Lomov/ Trotsky  
Elizabeth Hubbard as Nadezhda  
Milt Kamen (making his Broadway debut) as Kamenev /Grigori Nikitin  
Betty Walker as Olga Evgeyevna/ Krupskaya  
Sean Allen as Ensemble  
Robert Berdeen (AKA Robert Aberdeen) as Ensemble  
Ramon Bieri as Alliluyev  
Frank Bouley as Second Sailor/Ensemble  
John Carver as First Sailor/Ensemble  
John A. Coe as Rykov/Ensemble  
Carole Crook as Ensemble  
Michael Enserro as Zinoviev/Ensemble  
Janet Frank as Ensemble  
Richard Frisch as Ensemble  
Rico Froehlich as Brustein /Cheidze  
Gene Gross as Muranov/Sverdlov  
Bruce Kimes as Bronsky/Ensemble  
Simm Landres as Molotov/Ensemble  
Penelope Laughton as Ensemble  
Royce Lenelle as Ensemble  
Michael McGuire as Kapinsky/Ensemble  
Sylvia O'Brien as Ensemble  
Anthony Palmer as Mirsky/Ensemble  
Gedda Petry as Ensemble  
Richard Robbins as Ensemble  
Nicholas Saunders as Sukhanov/Orjonikidze/Ensemble  
Jon Silo Klurman as General Kornilov  
Peggy Steffans as Ensemble  
Elaine Sulka as Ensemble  
Don Wesley as Chugurin  
Carol Wilder as Soloist/Ensemble  
Mervyn Williams as Rusikov/Skobelov/Ensemble  
Stafford Wing as Ensemble

Reception
The Passion of Josef D. was not well-received upon its initial release. Howard Taubman wrote, "Since he can write with tension and power, Mr. Chayefsky has developed some scenes that have dramatic intensity. But his intoxication with the thunder of the English language also has betrayed him into bursts of rhetoric. His careful researching of his subject has led him into long discourses that are not dramatic at all, but oratorical flourishes in hindsight."

References

External links
 

1964 plays
Plays by Paddy Chayefsky